Homotrypa is an extinct genus of bryozoans from the Ordovician and Silurian periods, known from fossils found in the United States. Its colonies are branch-like and have small monticules made of groups of three or four larger zooecia slightly protruding out from the main surface of the colony. In cross section, the zooecia (tubes housing individual zooids) are erect in axis and gently curve toward the surface of the colony.

Species
Homotrypa curvata (Ulrich, 1882)
Homotrypa niagarensis (Ernst, Brett and Wilson, 2019)
Homotrypa anticostiensis (Bassler, 1928)
Homotrypa ramulosa (Bassler, 1903)

References

Trepostomata
Animals described in 1882
Prehistoric bryozoan genera